The Pick Up is an Australian drive radio show with Brittany Hockley, Laura Byrne and Mitch Churi. It is broadcast on the KIIS Network from 3pm to 4pm on weekdays. Daily podcasts were available for download from the show's website.

History
In August 2011, Australian Radio Network signed Chrissie Swan and Yumi Stynes to host a national drive show across the Mix Network aimed at women, primarily mothers in the 25 to 44 age demographic picking up children from school.

In April 2012, writer and comedian Wendy Harmer joined the show as a regular on Thursday's to discuss issues pertaining to women and families.

In August 2012, Yumi Stynes was appointed breakfast presenter with Mix 106.5 in Sydney and was replaced by Jane Hall.

In December 2014, Chrissie Swan left the show due to her contract not being renewed.

In January 2015, Katie 'Monty' Dimond and Zoe Marshall were announced as the new hosts of the 3PM Pick-Up. In December 2015, Australian Radio Network announced that Meshel Laurie and Katie 'Monty' Dimond would host the show from January 2016.

In January 2017, Australian Radio Network announced that Rebecca Judd and Yumi Stynes will host the show alongside Katie 'Monty' Dimond. Meshel Laurie has left the show to focus on Matt & Meshel and other media commitments.

In November 2020, Australian Radio Network announced that Kate Langbroek will host the show and join Monty Dimond and Yumi Stynes from January 27, 2021, replacing Rebecca Judd who has decided to take a break from media.

In October 2022, Australian Radio Network announced that the show will be axed and that Kate Langbroek, Monty Dimond and Yumi Stynes will leave the KIIS Network.

In January 2023, Australian Radio Network announced the show would be rebranded to The Pick Up and it will be hosted by Brittany Hockley, Laura Byrne and Mitch Churi.

References

External links
The Pick Up

Australian radio programs
2010s Australian radio programs
2020s Australian radio programs